Olga is an urban locality (an urban-type settlement) and the administrative center of Olginsky District of Primorsky Krai, Russia, located on the Olga Bay of the Sea of Japan,  northeast of Nakhodka. Population:

History
During the Balhae Kingdom period, a town called Anju was founded near the present-day Olga, on the shores of the Olga Bay.

The military post of Olga was established by the Russians in 1858, several months after the region passed to Russia under the terms of the Treaty of Aigun. It was named for St. Olga. In the 19th century, it had a significant Chinese minority. This town has a similar name to the eldest daughter of Nicholas II.

Notable residents 

Valentin Parinov (born 1959), swimmer
Ivan Stolbovoy (born 1986), football player

References

External links

 The capitals and the prefectures of Bohai Kingdom

1858 establishments in the Russian Empire
Populated places established in 1858
Urban-type settlements in Primorsky Krai